Christopher Bartsch (born 6 August 1979) is a German curler. He was born in Hamburg. He competed at the 2011 European Curling Championships in Moscow, and at the 2014 Winter Olympics in Sochi. He has also worked as television reporter on the sport of curling.

References

External links 
 

1979 births
Living people
Sportspeople from Hamburg
Curlers at the 2014 Winter Olympics
German male curlers
Olympic curlers of Germany